Ivanna Vale is a Venezuelan model and beauty pageant titleholder. She represented Táchira state at Miss Venezuela 2012 and won the Miss Coffee International or the Reinado Internacional del Café 2013 in Manizales (Colombia) on 12 January 2013.

See also
 Miss Venezuela 2012
 Reinado Internacional del Café 2013

References

External links
Miss Venezuela Official Website

1992 births
Living people
Venezuelan female models